The 2015 Texas Bowl was an American college football bowl game played on December 29, 2015, at NRG Stadium in Houston, Texas. It was one of the 2015–16 bowl games that concludes the 2015 FBS football season. The tenth edition of the Texas Bowl, it featured the LSU Tigers of the Southeastern Conference against the Texas Tech Red Raiders of the Big 12 Conference. The game began at 8:00 p.m. CST and was aired on ESPN. Sponsored by the AdvoCare nutrition and sports performance company, it was officially known as the AdvoCare V100 Texas Bowl.

Teams

LSU Tigers

Texas Tech Red Raiders

Game summary

Scoring summary 

Source:

Statistics

References

External links
 Game summary at ESPN

Texas Bowl
Texas Bowl
LSU Tigers football bowl games
Texas Tech Red Raiders football bowl games
Texas Bowl
Texas Bowl|Texas Bowl
Texas Bowl